Hex Publishers is an independent publishing company based in Erie, Colorado, USA, that specializes in genre fiction including science fiction, horror and dark fantasy, and publishes the online magazine Words, which features free short fiction, movie reviews and author interviews. Hex was founded by Joshua Viola (owner) and Dean Wyant in 2014 before the company's first release, Nightmares Unhinged.

Authors
Authors published by Hex Publishers include Carrie Vaughn, Edward Bryant, Steve Alten, Jeanne C. Stein, Kat Richardson, Paolo Bacigalupi, Minister Faust, Stephen Graham Jones, Steve Rasnic Tem, Richard Kadrey, Matthew Kressel, Cat Rambo, Sarah Pinsker, Alyssa Wong, Mike Resnick, Alistair Rennie and E. Lily Yu.

References

External links
 Official website

2014 establishments in Pennsylvania
American speculative fiction publishers
Book publishing companies based in Pennsylvania
Companies based in Erie, Pennsylvania
Publishing companies established in 2014
Small press publishing companies